The von der Leyen Commission is the current European Commission, in office since 1 December 2019 and is to last until the 2024 elections. It has Ursula von der Leyen as its president and it further consists of one commissioner from each of the member states of the European Union (other than the President’s state, Germany).

The Commission was scheduled to take office on 1 November 2019; however, the French, Hungarian and Romanian commissioner-candidates lost their confirmation votes by the European Parliament in early October 2019, so new commissioners had to be selected from those three member states by the President-elect and subsequently confirmed by the Parliament. This process took place in November 2019 and the Commission eventually took office in its entirety on 1 December 2019.

Election and formation 

Von der Leyen, a member of the European People's Party (EPP), was selected and proposed to the European Parliament by the European Council on 3 July 2019 following three days of negotiations between leaders of the member states. Von der Leyen faced many critics, especially among MEPs, since the European Council ignored the so-called spitzenkandidat system when choosing her for the position.

On 16 July 2019, the European Parliament took a vote on the proposal by the European Council and elected Von der Leyen with 383 votes (374 votes needed). Before the vote, von der Leyen had received the support of three largest political groups in the Parliament (EPP, S&D and RE), and during the debate the conservative Polish party Law and Justice with 24 MEPs and the Italian Five Stars Movement (M5S) with 14 MEPs declared their support. Based on the result of the vote, nearly 100 MEPs of the unofficial grand coalition EPP-S&D-RE did not vote for Von der Leyen. Based on the debate and public announcements of the MEPs, most of the MEPs voting against von der Leyen probably came from the S&D group, part of which is also German Social Democratic Party, which publicly opposed Von der Leyen because of her work as German Defence Minister.

Following her election, President of the European Council Donald Tusk asked von der Leyen to give her consent on appointing Josep Borrell of Spain as the next EU High Representative. Consent was given on 26 July 2019, following which the European Council officially appointed Borrell as the next High Representative of the Union for Foreign Affairs and Security Policy on 5 August 2019.

The Commission was approved by the European Parliament on 27 November 2019, receiving 461 votes, with 157 against and 89 abstentions. EPP, S&D, Renew Europe and half of the ECR voted in favour. The Greens/EFA abstained.

College of Commissioners 
Even before von der Leyen's confirmation, she pledged to renominate Frans Timmermans, the spitzenkandidat of the Party of European Socialists as the First Vice President. Margrethe Vestager, one of the leading candidates of the Alliance of Liberal and Democrats for Europe Party (ALDE), was said by von der Leyen will become Vice President as well, having de facto equal position to that of Timmermans. Other names have been mentioned by various news outlets as candidates. Some of the member states have already submitted the official nominations to the President-in-office of the Council of the EU.

Von der Leyen requested that member states each propose two candidates, a man and a woman, so it would be easier to form a gender-balanced commission. France's Thierry Breton was the last candidate to be designated on 24 October 2019 by Emmanuel Macron.

Changes 
 26 August 2020: Following Golfgate and a controversy about his travels in Ireland in preceding weeks, which conflicted with the Irish COVID-19 guidelines, Trade Commissioner Phil Hogan resigned.
 7 October 2020: Mairead McGuinness, Ireland's nominee to replace Phil Hogan is confirmed by the European Parliament and becomes a member of the commission.

Commission departments

Directorates-General

Executive agencies and service departments

Executive agencies

Service departments

Selection of the candidate for president 
Following the example of the 2014 European Election, in advance of the 2019 elections the main European political parties named so-called spitzenkandidaten, or leading candidates, who were the parties' candidates to become the next president of the European Commission. All of the parties named at least one candidate; some named two, while the Alliance of Liberals and Democrats for Europe Party (ALDE), which officially opposed the system of spitzenkandidaten, introduced "Team Europe," which consisted of several high-ranking European politicians. However, other parties perceived those candidates, especially Margrethe Vestager of Denmark, as leading candidates.

The leading candidates were:

After winning 2019 European election, the European People's Party claimed that the position of the President of the European Commission should be given to them and wanted their leading candidate Manfred Weber for the job. However, Weber faced strong opposition from the liberal-leaning French President Emmanuel Macron and the ALDE, and from the Party of European Socialists (PES) as well; opposition was driven by Weber's lack of experience, since he had only previously served as MEP and never held any governmental position. The PES strongly supported the candidature of Frans Timmermans, who also had support from most of the ALDE members of the European Council. (Andrej Babiš, then Czech Prime Minister, is a member of the ALDE but also of the Visegrad Four, which strongly opposed Timmermans because of his support for migration quotas and inability to reach compromises.) The ALDE Party wanted to see Margrethe Vestager taking the top Commission job.

The first European Council meeting was held on 20 and 21 June 2019, bringing no decision on distribution of EU top jobs. President Donald Tusk summoned leaders again for a special meeting that lasted from 30 June until 2 July 2019. Over three days of negotiations, the EPP gave up on Weber becoming the President of the Commission; it seemed that Timmermans might be nominated, especially after he met with Bulgarian Prime Minister and EPP member Boyko Borisov at the Bulgarian Embassy in Belgium during the meeting of the European Council. Naming Timmermans President of the European Commission would have been a part of the so-called Osaka deal, a plan that was formed by several EU leaders (Emmanuel Macron, Angela Merkel, Giuseppe Conte, Donald Tusk, Mark Rutte, and Pedro Sánchez) during the 2019 G20 Summit in Osaka, Japan.

However, the opposition from Visegrad Four, now joined by Croatia and Italy, was still strong, and Timmermans could not win a Council majority. Other names mentioned during the negotiations included Michel Barnier, Kristalina Georgieva and Andrej Plenković; it became clear after the Council ended that Plenković's name had been introduced by Commission Secretary-General Martin Selmayr, who is Plenković's close friend. The candidature was rejected by Macron, who opposed the personal ambitions of leaders.

When Ursula von der Leyen (EPP)'s name emerged as a potential candidate, it was a surprise and she faced many critics, mainly because she had not been a spitzenkandidat. The German Social Democratic Party, part of the German government coalition, opposed von der Leyen due to her work as minister of defence, which resulted in the German Chancellor Angela Merkel's abstention during the Council's vote on the proposal. Nevertheless, all other European Council members voted in favor, and she was nominated as the next President of the European Commission.

Brexit vacancy 

With the three month Brexit delay requested, the United Kingdom had not nominated any British commissioner. This was a unique event with no precedent in the history of the European Union. Von der Leyen had to formally request the British Government nominate an EU commissioner. She also asked the legal service if the Commission could operate without a British commissioner. Some MEPs have suggested the possibility of a vote to allow the EU Commission to operate without a British commissioner.

The United Kingdom left the European Union at 23:00 GMT on 31 January 2020, so the position of British commissioner remained vacant until its automatic abolition when Brexit occurred.

Policy

Geopolitical Commission 

From the outset of her mandate as President of the European Commission, von der Leyen stated her intention to have a “geopolitical commission.”
The French President Emmanuel Macron is the most important driving force behind the ambition of a geopolitical commission. His vision is that the EU must become a political and strategic player with one voice.
Critics have pointed out that by flying the geopolitical flag, Commission President von der Leyen has exposed the weaknesses of the EU as a whole in playing a decisive role at the high diplomatic table.

COVID-19 
In response to the COVID-19 pandemic, the EU passed the Next Generation EU package, worth 750 billion euros. Von der Leyen's Commission proposed the package on 27 May 2020.

References 

 
2019 establishments in Europe
European Commissions
Current governments
2020s in Europe